Bobby Keyes (born September 1953) is an American guitarist and songwriter from Saugus, Massachusetts, United States.

Keyes began playing guitar professionally at age 6, in clubs north of Boston.

Keyes is a versatile session guitarist and writer who has played and collaborated with a wide range of famous rock and roll, soul, blues, R&B, and pop recording artists.

Style 
Keyes has been called a virtuoso and a master of American roots music.

Equipment 
Keyes often plays a 1959 Gibson ES-330.  He uses a 1964 Fender Vibrolux Reverb amplifier.

Discography 
 Solo
 Lucky Stereo (1999)
 Lady Luck (2004)
 Cloud 9 (2014)
 Dojogobo (2014)

 With Tommy Page
Paintings in My Mind (1990)

 With Jerry Lee Lewis
Young Blood (1995)
 With KD Bell.. 1999 Thrillionare records
 With Jordan Knight
Jordan Knight (1999)

 With Joey McIntyre
Stay the Same (1999)

 With Mýa
Fear of Flying (2000)

 With Robin Thicke
A Beautiful World (2003)
The Evolution of Robin Thicke (2007)
Something Else (2008)
Love After War (2011)
Blurred Lines (2013)
Paula (2014)

 With The Mystix
Satisfy You (2006)
Blue Morning (2007) 
Down to the Shore (2009) 
Mighty Tone (2012)

 Movie Soundtracks
Dick Tracy (1990)
For the Love of Movies: The Story of American Film Criticism (2009)

References

External links 
 Official Web Site

American blues guitarists
American male guitarists
American session musicians
People from Saugus, Massachusetts
Songwriters from Massachusetts
Guitarists from Massachusetts
American male songwriters